There are several historical forts in the U.S. state of Florida. De Quesada states that there have been more than 300 "camps, batteries, forts and redoubts" in Florida, since European settlement began. More than 80 "blockhouses, forts, camps and stockades" were used at one time or another in Florida, during the Seminole Wars. Most forts were constructed from earth or wood, or both; some incorporate brick or stone. Many were intended to be used for only a short period, and most have effectively disappeared. In some cases, a series of forts with different names were built on or close to the same place.

List of forts
Battery San Antonio, Pensacola
Camp Daniels
Camp Darley - Second Seminole War fortification.
Camp Munroe - Second Seminole War fortification. p. 170.
Camp Dunlawton - Second Seminole War fortification - site of the Battle of Dunlawton.
Camp Scott, Everglades
Cantonment Clinch, Pensacola
Castillo de San Marcos (also Fort Marion and Fort St. Mark, now a U.S. National Monument)
Fort Alabama see Fort Foster
Fort Ann
Fort Annuttgeliea
Fort Arbuckle, Frostproof, Polk County
Fort Armstrong, near Bushnell. On December 28, 1835, 180 Seminoles ambushed Major Francis L. Dade and his two U.S. Army companies of 110 soldier, resulting in the Dade battle. All but three of Dade's men were killed. The massacre began the Second Seminole War. A regiment of Tennessee militiamen led by Major Robert Armstrong, built Fort Armstrong at the site of Dade's Massacre. From Fort Armstrong, Brigadier General Keith Call led an attack on the Seminoles living in the Wahoo Swamp a few days after the fort's construction ended.
Fort Barnwell - Second Seminole War fort - was also known as Fort Columbia.
Fort Barker
Fort Barrancas (also Fort San Carlos de Barrancas)
Fort Basinger - Second and Third Seminole War Fort.
Fort Birch - Second Seminole War Fort.
Fort Blount
Fort Braden
Fort Brooke - Second Seminole War Fort.
Fort Brooks - Second Seminole War Fort.
Fort Butler
 Fort Caben - Second Seminole War Fort.
Fort Call - Second Seminole War Fort.
Fort Caroline
Fort Carroll
Fort Casey
Fort Center
Fort Chokonikla (also Fort Chokkonickla and Fort Chokhonikla, now part of Paynes Creek Historic State Park)
Fort Christian - Second Seminole War Fort. p. 190.
Fort Christmas – one in a series of four small, short lived forts built along the St. Johns River during the Seminole Wars. These forts were used to garrison troops and protect supplies during War.
Fort Clarke, in present-day Gainesville, Second Seminole War
Fort Clinch
Fort Coombs
Fort Cooper
Fort Crèvecoeur (French), First Spanish Period
Fort Cross, on Cape Sable, Third Seminole War
Fort Cummings - Second Seminole War Fort.
Fort Dade (Withlacoochee River), Second Seminole War
Fort Dade (Egmont Key), Spanish–American War
Fort Dallas, Miami - Second Seminole War fort.
Fort De Soto
Fort Defiance, Second Seminole War
Fort Denaud - Second Seminole War fort.
Fort Diego
Fort Denaud, LaBelle
Fort Doane
Fort Drane - Second Seminole War fort.
Fort Drum
Fort Dulaney - Second Seminole War fort.
Fort Duncan McRee (also Addison Blockhouse) - Second Seminole War Fort.
Fort Fanning - Second Seminole War Fort. Also known as Fort Mellon.
Fort Florida - Second Seminole War Fort.
Fort Foster - Established during the Second Seminole War as Fort Alabama by Colonel William Lindsay in present day Hillsborough County, Florida. Fort Alabama was destroyed and a new fort, Fort Foster, was built to replace it and named for Lieutenant Colonel William S. Foster. Fort Foster State Historic Site is a reproduction of the fort and is a part of the Hillsborough River State Park.
Fort Foster, Collier County - not to be confused with Fort Foster in Hillsborough County.
Fort Floyd - Second Seminole War Fort.
Fort Fraser
Fort Fulton - Second Seminole War Fort.
Fort Gadsden
Fort Gardiner - Second Seminole War Fort.
Fort Gatlin
Fort George
Fort Green
Fort Hanson - Second Seminole War Fort - (located eighteen miles southwest of St. Augustine).
Fort Harlee
Fort Harrell
Fort Hartsuff
Fort Harvie
Fort Heilman - Second Seminole War Fort.
Fort Homer W. Hesterly
Fort Hooker
Fort Houston, in Tallahassee, Civil War
Fort Jackson - Second Seminole War Fort.
Fort Jefferson
Fort Jupiter - Second Seminole War Fort. pp. 190, 193.
Fort Keais
Fort Keats - Second Seminole War Fort.
Fort King - Second Seminole War Fort.
Fort Kingsbury - Second Seminole War Fort.
Fort Kissimmee
Fort Lane – one in a series of four small, short lived forts built along the St. Johns River during the Seminole Wars. These forts were used to garrison troops and protect supplies during War.
Fort Lauderdale - Second Seminole War Fort.
Fort Lloyd
Fort Lonesome
Fort Macomb - Second Seminole War Fort.
Fort Maitland
Fort Mason
Fort Matanzas
Fort McCoy (formerly Fort MacKay)
Fort McNeil, north bank of Taylor Creek, Orange County
Fort McRee
Fort Meade
Fort Mellon – one in a series of four small, short lived forts built along the St. Johns River during the Seminole Wars. These forts were used to garrison troops and protect supplies during War.
Fort Micanopy, Second Seminole War
Fort Mitchell
Fort Mose
Fort Myakka
Fort Myers
Fort New Smyrna - Second Seminole War Fort.
Fort Ogden
Fort Peyton - Second Seminole War Fort -  (originally called Fort Moultrie which was located 6 miles west of St. Augustine).
Fort Pickens
Fort Picolata
Fort Pierce - Second Seminole War Fort.
Fort Poinsett, on Cape Sable, Second Seminole War.
Fort Preston - Second Seminole War Fort.
Fort Reid
Fort Russell, on Key Biscayne, Second Seminole War
Fort St. Andrews
Fort St. Francis de Pupa
Fort San Carlos, Fernandina Beach, Second Spanish rule
Fort San Lucia
Fort San Luis de Apalachee
Fort San Marcos de Apalache (also Fort St. Marks)
Fort San Nicholas
Fort Scott
Fort Shackleford
Fort Shannon - Second Seminole War fortification.
Fort Simmons
Fort Simon Drum
Fort Stansbury
Fort Starke
Fort Sullivan
Fort Tarver - Second Seminole War fortified plantation

Fort Taylor – one in a series of four small, short lived forts built along the St. Johns River during the Seminole Wars. These forts were used to garrison troops and protect supplies during War. This should not be confused with Fort Zachary Taylor (see below), built in Key West, Florida, approximately 280 miles to the Southwest of this Fort Taylor's location. The future President was a Colonel during the Second Seminole War and served in the Florida campaigns at the same time this Fort Taylor was in active operation.
Fort T.B. Adams
Fort Thompson
Fort Tonyn
Fort Vinton
Fort Volusia - Second Seminole War Fort.
Fort Wacahoota - Second Seminole War Fort.
Fort Walker (also Fort Hogtown), in present-day Gainesville, Second Seminole War
Fort Walton
Fort Ward
Fort Weadman
Fort White - Second Seminole War Fort.
Fort William
Fort Zachary Taylor (also Fort Taylor) – Fort Zachary Taylor should not be confused with the original Florida "Fort Taylor" – entry above, which was built during the Second Seminole War as one of a string of four small, short-lived Forts along the Saint John's River, approximately 280 miles to the Northeast of Key West, Florida. During the Second Seminole War (1835 – 1842) future President Zachary Taylor – for whom this Key West, Florida fort was named – was a Colonel in the US Army, leading troops in the field.
Mala Compra Fortress also known as the Post at Mala Compra - Second Seminole War fortification.
Martello towers, Key West, Florida
Fort East Martello
West Martello Tower
Post at Orange Grove Plantation - Second Seminole War fortress.
Negro Fort
Presidio Santa Maria de Galve, Pensacola
St. Joseph's Fortress also known as Camp Brisbane - Second Seminole War fortification.
Yellow Bluff Fort

See also
 List of forts in the United States
 Florida Seminole Wars Heritage Trail.

Notes

References
de Quesada, Alejandro M. (2006) A History of Florida Forts. Charleston, South Carolina: The History Press. 
Rajtar, Steve. (2007) A guide to historic Gainesville. Charleston, South Carolina: The History Press. 
Stewart, R. W. (2005 and 2009). American military history - Volume 1 - the United States Army and the forging of a nation, 1775 - 1917, second edition (2nd ed.). Washington, DC: Center of Military History, United States Army.  "Map 20" on page 170 of this book shows the location of Florida forts and battles during the Second Seminole War (1835 - 1842).

Lists of buildings and structures in Florida
Florida